The retromolar fossa is a fossa of the mandible located posteriorly to the third molar. Part of the  temporal muscle's tendon inserts into it.

References

Facial bones
Vertebrate anatomy